Qüləbənd (also, Quləbənd, Gyuleband and Kulabend) is a village and municipality in the Ujar Rayon of Azerbaijan.  It has a population of 1,077. The municipality consists of the villages of Qüləbənd and Bağırbəyli.

References 

Populated places in Ujar District